Low in High School is the eleventh solo studio album by British singer Morrissey, released on 17 November 2017 through BMG. It was produced by Joe Chiccarelli, and recorded at La Fabrique Studios in France and at Ennio Morricone's Forum Studios in Italy.

The album debuted at number 5 on the UK Albums Chart. Low in High School generally received mixed or average reviews.

Background and release
Prior to the album's release, it was reported that several retailers including HMV had refused to stock the album due to its cover art, though this was later denied by HMV. The child on the cover is Max Lopez (noted in the article as Msax), the son of Morrissey's bassist, Mando Lopez.

The first single, "Spent the Day in Bed", received its first play on 19 September 2017 and was released on the same day. Along with the release of the single, Morrissey announced an upcoming US tour. "I Wish You Lonely" was released as an instant grat download on 24 October. "Jacky's Only Happy When She's Up on the Stage" was released on 7 November. Two more singles were released in 2018.

The 'deluxe edition' of Low in High School was released in December 2018, and features four extra studio tracks and five bonus live tracks.  The deluxe edition studio track "Back on the Chain Gang" was issued as a single in late 2018.

Critical reception

On the review aggregator website Metacritic,  Low in High School has a score of 59 out of 100 based on 43 reviews, indicating "mixed or average" reception. 
Stephen Thomas Erlewine of AllMusic gave Low in High School a rating of three out of five stars, stating it is "one of Morrissey's most musically adventurous records" but "can seem as aurally conflicted as it is politically". Josh Modell, writing for The A.V. Club, gave the album a B rating and said it might be Morrissey's best release since You Are the Quarry. Alexis Petridis in The Guardian also gave it three out of five stars. Jordan Bassett, writing for NME, gave the album two out of five stars, stating "the 12-song album's first five tracks are passable, if not actually quite enjoyable. Beyond this point, though, only the most hardened Moz fan should dare to venture."

Accolades

Track listing

Personnel
 Morrissey – lead vocals

Additional personnel
 Jesse Tobias – guitars
 Gustavo Manzur – keyboards
 Boz Boorer – guitars
 Matthew Ira Walker – drums
 Mando Lopez – bass guitar
Roger Joseph Manning – string arrangement, horn arrangement
H.E.R. – violin (8, 12)
Steve Aho – orchestration
Songa Lee – violin
Kathleen Sloan – violin
Erik Arvinder – viola
Andy Martin – trombone
Fred Simmons – trombone
Gustavo Manzur – backing vocals
Davide Dell'Amore – engineering
Damien Arlot – engineering
Samuel Wahl – engineering
Morgane Myollet – engineering
Miro Lagioa – technical
Joe Chiccarelli – producing

Charts

References

2017 albums
Morrissey albums
Albums produced by Joe Chiccarelli